Oaky Creek (previously Oakey Creek) is a rural locality in the Scenic Rim Region, Queensland, Australia. In the  Oaky Creek had a population of 83 people.

Geography 
Oaky Creek is a hilly undeveloped area occupying a valley with a single creek flowing into the Logan River.

History
Timber was an important early industry in the area. There was a sawmill at Oakey Creek. This sawmill no longer exists.

In the  Oaky Creek had a population of 83 people.

Education 
There are no schools in Oaky Creek. The nearest primary schools are Rathdowney State School in Rathdowney to the west, Hillview State School in neighbouring Hillview to the east, and Tamrookum State School in Tamrookum to the north. The nearest secondary school is Beaudesert State High School in Beaudesert to the north.

References

External links 

Scenic Rim Region
1997 establishments in Australia
Populated places established in 1997
Localities in Queensland